"Aayega Aanewala" is one of the most well known songs from Indian cinema. It was prominent in the film Mahal being sung by Lata Mangeshkar. Khemchand Prakash composed the music, while Nakshab Jaaravchi wrote the lyrics. It has been described as "one most effective song picturization of yesteryears".

Development

Lyrics

Reception

References

Indian music